Jesús Turró (born 9 December 1952) is a Spanish sailor. He competed in the Tempest event at the 1976 Summer Olympics.

References

External links
 

1952 births
Living people
Spanish male sailors (sport)
Olympic sailors of Spain
Sailors at the 1976 Summer Olympics – Tempest
Sportspeople from Barcelona